The Driehaus Architecture Prize, fully named The Richard H. Driehaus Prize at the University of Notre Dame, is a global award to honor a major contributor in the field of contemporary traditional and classical architecture. The Driehaus Prize was conceived as an alternative to the predominantly modernist Pritzker Prize.

It was initiated by fund manager and philanthropist Richard Driehaus and established in 2003 by the Richard H. Driehaus Charitable Lead Trust. It is presented annually through the classical-teaching School of Architecture at the University of Notre Dame in Indiana, United States.

The most recent prize winner of 2020 is Ong-ard Satrabhandhu, who received the award during a ceremony on March 28 in Chicago. The 2019 laureate was Maurice Culot of ARCAS Architecture & Urbanism.

The jury also awards the Henry Hope Reed Award (given in conjunction with the Driehaus Prize) to an individual working outside the practice of architecture, who has supported the cultivation of the traditional city, its architecture and art through writing, planning or promotion. The 2020 Reed Award was given to Clem Labine, the creator of the Palladio Award, which recognizes excellence in traditional design, and the eponymous Clem Labine Award for creating more humane and beautiful environments.

Award
The Driehaus Prize is awarded to a living architect whose work embodies the principles of traditional and classical architecture and urbanism in contemporary society, and reflects what the jury considers positive cultural, environmental and artistic impacts.  The award itself is a bronze miniature of the Choragic Monument of Lysicrates, known as the first use of the Corinthian order on the outside of a building. The award includes a monetary prize of US$200,000.

The award jury annually selects an architect who has greatly influenced the field of traditional and classical architecture. The jury travels together to a city of architectural significance, exploring it together, and taking the city's urban fabric as a backdrop for its deliberations.

The jury has included notable architects and educators such as Adele Chatfield-Taylor (since 2004, President Emerita of the American Academy in Rome), Robert S. Davis (since 2009, developer and co-founder of Seaside, Florida), Paul Goldberger (since 2006, former architecture critic for The New Yorker), Léon Krier (since 2005, inaugural Driehaus Prize recipient), Witold Rybczynski (since 2011, architecture critic and professor of urbanism at the University of Pennsylvania), Demetri Porphyrios (since 2013, is a Greek architect and author who practices architecture in London as principal of the firm Porphyrios Associates), and Elizabeth Plater-Zyberk (since 2017, founder of DPZ).

In 2012, the then Charles, Prince of Wales (current King Charles III) accepted The Richard H. Driehaus Prize at the University of Notre Dame Patronage Award during a ceremony Jan. 27 at St James's Palace in London.

History
Driehaus, the founder, chief investment officer and chairman of Driehaus Capital Management in Chicago, established the award program through Notre Dame in 2003 because of its reputation as a national leader in incorporating the ideals of traditional and classical architecture into the task of modern urban development. In 2007, Driehaus announced that he would increase the prize monies given out annually through the Driehaus Prize and the Reed Award to a combined $250,000. The two prizes represent the most significant recognition for classicism in the contemporary built environment.

Laureates
The following architects have been awarded the Driehaus Prize since 2003:

Laureates by country

See also
 New Classical Architecture
 Vernacular architecture
 New Urbanism
 Richard H. Driehaus
 Henry Hope Reed Jr.
 Notre Dame School of Architecture
 Rafael Manzano Prize

References

Bibliography

External links

Driehaus Prize Official site
Video Channel with Driehaus ceremonies and colloquiums, Notre Dame School of Architecture (introductory video on the Driehaus Prize)
 New Classical Architecture and 10 years of the Driehaus Prize (Video)
Award article

 
Architecture awards
Awards established in 2003
New Classical architecture
Awards and prizes of the University of Notre Dame